Used in television production and filmmaking post-production, a 2-pop is a 1 kHz tone that is one frame long and placed 2 seconds before the start of a program. It is a simple and effective method of ensuring synchronization between sound and picture in a video or film.

A 2-pop is typically placed at the end of a visual countdown. Only the first frame of the "2" is shown, and the remainder of the 2 seconds prior to the program is black. This provides a unique point of reference where the frame-long image and frame-long sound should align, similar to the way a film clapperboard is used to generate a synchronization point.

For example, in a television or video program the first frame of action (FFOA) starts at one hour (typically timecode of 01:00:00:00 in the US, and 10:00:00:00 in the UK), preceding that, 1 frame (or the 2-pop) of tone would be placed at timecode 00:59:58:00 or exactly 2 seconds before first picture. Alternately, in film post-production the leader starts at 01:00:00:00 (or 0+00 feet if using feet and frames as is common in the United States), the 2-pop starts at 01:00:06:00 (or 9+00), and the first frame of action (FFOA) starts at 01:00:08:00 (or 12+00).

A 2-pop is useful whenever picture and sound are handled separately. For example, projecting work-in-progress in the pre-video days involved a film projector linked to a magnetic dubber, onto which the separate soundtrack reel was loaded. Aligning them by the 2-pop would ensure proper synchronization during playback. A modern scenario would involve sending a soundtrack to a separate facility for a sound mix. The returned product is a computer audio file, which then needs to be synchronized again with the picture.

Sample sound 

Whereas laying down bars and tone prior to program start establishes video and audio calibration levels on the tape, the 2-pop is primarily used for picture and sound synchronization.  Therefore, while the loudness of the 2-pop may be the same as the bars and tone audio level in use, this is not a requirement. The loudness level should be sufficient to be heard clearly.

References

External links 
What is 2-Pop & How is it used?, Henri Rapp Recording

Television terminology
Film and video technology